David Barton may refer to:

 David Barton (politician) (1783–1837), U.S. senator from Missouri, serving 1821–1831
 David Barton (author) (born 1954), American author, evangelical minister, and political activist
 David K. Barton (born 1927), American radar systems engineer
 David Walker Barton (1801–1863), Virginia politician
 David Barton (footballer) (born 1959), English footballer
 David Barton (linguist) (born 1949), British linguist